The Glass Cage (American title: The Glass Tomb) is a 1955 British mystery film, directed by Montgomery Tully and starring John Ireland, Honor Blackman and Sid James. It was made by Hammer Film Productions.

Plot
A showman Pel (John Ireland) is contacted by an old friend Tony (Sid James) who has received a blackmail letter signed “Delores”. Pel agrees to check her out as she lives near a friend of his. Reaching her apartment he discovers she is an old pal, Rena, who has fallen on hard times and got mixed up with someone she regrets. She agrees to withdraw her blackmail attempt as it wasn’t her idea. 
In the apartment downstairs Pel offers to set up his Russian friend, Sapolio, in a “starvation act” to break the world record. A party is hastily arranged there for that night for their carnival pals. 
In the evening while popping out to buy olives Sapolio sees a man going up to Rena’s room. During the party Rena is found murdered. The chief suspect is Tony as the blackmail letter was discovered near the body. An unsavoury character Rorke (Sydney Tafler) first attempts to blackmail Stanton (Geoffrey Keen) who he knows had motive then also Tony but the latter draws a gun and in a struggle it is Tony who is killed. 
Rorke tries to put frighteners on Pel by briefly kidnapping his wife Jenny (Honor Blackman) but she escapes and the police move in to arrest Rorke. 
Pel tries to get Sapolio to remember who he saw on the night of Rena’s murder while he is “starving” in a glass cage. But someone passes strychnine-laced food inside the cage and Sapolio, suffering from the poisoning breaks the glass and accidentally kills himself. His death is covered up by Pel and the police to tempt the poisoner back to finish the job. He falls for the trick and returns to be confronted by police and shot dead trying to escape.

Cast

 John Ireland as Pel Pelham 
 Honor Blackman as Jenny Pelham 
 Geoffrey Keen as Harry Stanton 
 Eric Pohlmann as Sapolio 
 Sid James as Tony Lewis 
 Liam Redmond as Lindley 
 Sydney Tafler as Rorke
 Sam Kydd as George
 Ferdy Mayne as Bertie
 Tonia Bern as Rena Maroni
 Arthur Howard as Rutland
 Dandy Nichols as Woman with Child (uncredited)
 Bernard Bresslaw as Ivan the Terrible, Cossack Dancer (uncredited)

Critical reception
Dennis Schwartz called it "a moderate programmer that manages to get by its weak and unconvincing story by the efforts of its talented cast"; while Leonard Maltin noted that "Bizarre carnival backgrounds give this typical murder tale some spice."

References

External links
 

1955 films
1955 crime films
1950s mystery films
British crime films
British mystery films
Films directed by Montgomery Tully
British black-and-white films
Circus films
Hammer Film Productions films
Lippert Pictures films
1950s English-language films
1950s British films